Eugène Le Moignic (2 May 1875 – 1 August 1947) was a French naval physician, bacteriologist and politician. He was Senator of French India from 1928 to 1944.

Doctor

Eugène Le Moignic was born on 2 May 1875 in Toulon, Var.
He became a naval doctor and a skilled bacteriologist.
As a naval doctor, in 1909 he coauthored a report on protection of employees of British India against cholera, plague and typhoid fever.
In 1910 he wrote a report on vaccination against typhoid in Egypt and Malta using the method of Wright and Leishman.
He became head of the lipo-vaccine laboratory in Paris.
He was appointed a government commissioner.
Le Moignic was a close collaborator of Paul Painlevé.

Senator

In the 1928 senatorial elections for French India, Le Moignic was supported by Sellane Naicker of the Franco-Hindu party.
Le Moignic was elected senator of French India on 9 December 1928.
He sat with the Democratic Left group.
He was rapporteur of the committees on the navy, the army and the airforce, and was also rapporteur or member of the committee on the colonies.
On 28 June 1935 he reported the opinion of this committee on the bill to approve the Franco-Chinese convention.
Le Moignic was reelected on 20 October 1935 with a decisive majority.
The election was validated on 15 January 1936.
In 1936 he was involved in a discussion initiated by Henry Chéron on the lack of government initiative in ensuring decentralization and expansion of the armaments industry.
He blamed parliament for preventing the army and navy from entering into contracts as needed.

During World War II (1939–45), after the defeat of France Le Moignic voted for the Constitutional law of 10 July 1940 that established the regime of Vichy France.
After the Liberation of France Le Moignie was among the members of parliament who were exonerated by the Jury d'honneur.
The jury of honour removed the ineligibility caused by his vote for the constitutional law.
His mandate ended on 31 December 1944.
He died in Paris on 1 August 1947 at the age of 72.

Publications

Publications by Le Moignic include:

Notes

Sources

1875 births
1947 deaths
Senators of French India